Hal'lu is the first Rabbis' Sons album. It contained one of the only two songs they ever released with Yiddish lyrics ("A Sukkele").  "Mi Ho-ish", "Rabos Machshovos" and "Hal'lu" were among the group's most popular songs.

Track listing

References
 Chavrusa (April 2007, p. 12): Rabbis' Sons: Rabbinic Fathers – Itzy Weinberger (archived from the original - Nov. 8, 2012)
  Hal'lu (Emes issue) at FAU Jewish Sound Archives
  Hal’lu (Fran issue) at DJSA (Free registration)
  Hal’lu (Emes issue) at DJSA (Free registration)

1967 albums
Hasidic music
Jewish music albums